The governor of the Central Province, Sri Lanka ( Madhyama palāth āndukāravarayā), is the head of the provincial government and exercises executive power over subjects devolved to the Central Provincial Council. The governor is appointed by the president of Sri Lanka for a period of five years. The current governor is Lalith U Gamage

Governors

References

External links
 Central Provincial Council

 
Central